Southern Pacific Railroad's AC-12 class of cab forward steam locomotives was the last class of steam locomotives ordered by Southern Pacific.  They were built by Baldwin Locomotive Works during World War II, with the first, number 4275, entering service on October 27, 1943, and the last, 4294, on March 19, 1944. The locomotives were effectively a conventional 2-8-8-4 locomotive running in reverse; the tender being coupled at the smokebox end of the locomotive. This was made possible by the use of oil-firing. The distinct features of these locomotives include: a streamlined front with white band, an air horn on the front, a streamlined pilot, a SP 12 wheel box tender, and air compressors mounted on the smokebox. Southern Pacific used these locomotives all over its system, but they were extremely famous for working on Donner Pass & Cascade Summit.

SP used the AC-12s for a little over a decade with the first retirements occurring on April 5, 1955, and the last on September 24, 1958. Only one AC-12, SP 4294, has survived into preservation and is now on display at the California State Railroad Museum.

References 
 

AC-12
4-8-8-2 locomotives
Baldwin locomotives
Simple articulated locomotives
Railway locomotives introduced in 1943
Steam locomotives of the United States
Standard gauge locomotives of the United States
Freight locomotives 
Cab_forward_steam_locomotives